Okan Yalabık (born 13 December 1978) is a Turkish actor. He graduated theater at Istanbul University State Conservatory and master of Film and Drama in Kadir Has University. He has appeared in more than twenty films since 2001.

Life and career 
Yalabık was born in 1978 in Istanbul as the second child of his family who originate from Balıkesir. He went to the Maçka Primary School at a young age showed interest in acting. According to his interview, it was his brother, Ozan, who brought home a cassette of Ferhan Şensoy's movie Ferhangi Şeyler and Yalabık memorized every line of it and became determined to become an actor. He later went to Şişli Terakki High School followed by Sakıp Sabancı Anadolu High School, and in 1993 by inviting Cengiz Deveci to the school he helped in the establishment of Sakıp Sabancı Anadolu High School Theater Department. Yalabık, who played in various roles in many amateur groups, eventually got enrolled in Istanbul University State Conservatory in 1997 to study theater. He had his first role in 1998 by playing the character Martı in a play at Kenter Theater. Later he portrayed different characters in the plays Nükte, Sırça Kümes, İnishmorelu Yüzbaşı at the same venue. In 2006, he appeared in Orhan Hakalmaz's clip Şu Kışlanın Kapısına, and in 2007, together Sezin Akbaşoğulları, he played in Robert Bosch GmbH's commercial for Turkey. Later he started to act in the movies such as Gülüm and Kolay Para.

He was cast in the hit crime series Yılan Hikâyesi. He played in Serseri with his ex-girlfriend Gamze Özçelik. He played in hit perid series Hatırla Sevgili with Beren Saat, Cansel Elçin. In 2010, for he role as Hasan in Yavuz Turgul's movie Av Mevsimi he won the "Best Supporting Actor" award at the 4th Yeşilçam Awards. At the same year he took part in Kadir Has University Film and Drama Graduate Program.

In 2011, portrayed Pargalı İbrahim Pasha on the historical TV series Muhteşem Yüzyıl and has appeared in 82 episodes, though he does voiceovers in later episodes for his character.

In 2015, he was cast in atv's Analar ve Anneler directed by Mehmet Ada Öztekin, and was part of the main cast alongside Sinem Kobal, Hazar Ergüçlü and Binnur Kaya. But, due to low ratings, the series ended after 9 episodes.

In 2016, he was cast in a movie about the effects left behind by the Balkan Wars, titled Annemin Yarası, which was directed by Ozan Açıktan. At the same year he voiced the characters Adnan ve Çizer on the animation film Kötü Kedi Şerafettin based on Bülent Üstün's novel

He also continued his theater career by appearing on the play The 39 Steps'' in Turkey.

Filmography

Theater

Voice

Awards
 Yeşilçam Award for best supporting actor (2011)

References

External links
 

1978 births
Living people
Male actors from Istanbul
Turkish male film actors
Turkish male television actors
21st-century Turkish male actors